Perfidy is a 1953 Yugoslavian drama film directed by Vladimir Pogačić. It was entered into the 1953 Cannes Film Festival.

Cast
 Marija Crnobori - Jela Ledinic
 Milivoje Živanović - Niko Marinovic
 Viktor Starčić - Gospar Frano Drazic
 Severin Bijelić - Ivo Ledinic ... sin
 Milena Dapčević - Ane di Gracia
 Milan Ajvaz - Stari mornar
 Karlo Bulić - Kapetan broda
 Rahela Ferari - Mare
 Baro Kriletić
 Nevenka Mikulić
 Miša Mirković
 Zoran Ristanović
 Milutin Tatić
 Irina Viskovic
 Janez Vrhovec
 Pavle Vujisić - Mornar
 Čedomir Žarković

References

External links

1953 films
Serbo-Croatian-language films
1953 drama films
Yugoslav black-and-white films
Avala Film films
Films directed by Vladimir Pogačić
Films set in the 19th century
Yugoslav drama films